"Santa, Can't You Hear Me" is a duet by American singers Kelly Clarkson and Ariana Grande. It is the second single from Clarkson's ninth studio album and second Christmas album, When Christmas Comes Around... (2021). The song was written by Clarkson with Aben Eubanks, with the song's track recording was produced by Jason Halbert.

Release and reception
"Santa, Can't You Hear Me" was written by Clarkson with Aben Eubanks and produced by Jason Halbert. Following filming the 21st season of the American reality television series The Voice, Clarkson invited Grande to record the track with her. "Santa, Can't You Hear Me" was released by Atlantic Records on October 15, 2021, the day of the album's release. An uptempo big band pop Christmas anthem, the song lyrics sing of an appeal to Santa Claus. Instead of material gifts, the singers ask for answers on how they can achieve their outmost desire for Christmas, which is love.

Upon its release, Randee Dawn of Today remarked that the song is exactly what one might expect from the singers, writing that it  "bounces off each other with full-throated harmonies and high notes alike" and ends with a "big band-sounding flourish that will leave one's heart pounding for more. Reviewing the album for Vulture, Justin Curto highlighted the track as sounding as big as one would expect it to be. In her review of the track on iHeartRadio, Ariel King wrote that the song proves both the singers' talent and what makes them such "incredible powerhouses" is how they perfectly blend their vocals for "a captivating listen".

Promotion
On December 13, 2022, Clarkson performed the song, solo on the 22nd season finale of The Voice.

Personnel
Credits lifted from When Christmas Comes Around... liner notes

 Vocals – Kelly Clarkson, Ariana Grande
 Background vocals – Jessi Collins, Nayanna Holey, Tiffany Palmer, Brandon Winbush
 Producer, keyboards, B3, programming – Jason Halbert
 Engineers – John Hanes, Robert Venable, Tom Peltier, John DeNosky
 Mastering engineer – Chris Gehringer
 Bass – Kyle Whalum
 Drums – Lester Estelle
 Guitars – Aben Eubanks, Jaco Caraco, Luke Sullivant
 Mixer	– Serban Ghenea
 Percussion – Ron Sorbo
 Programming (additional)	– Rachel Or
 Orchestra arranger and conductor – Joseph Trapanese
 Orchestra contractor – Gina Zimmitti, Witney Martin
 Saxophone – Jesse McGinty
 Trumpet – Mike Cordone, Ray Montiero
 Trombone – Garrett Smith

Charts

Release history

References

2021 songs
2022 singles
Atlantic Records singles
American Christmas songs
Ariana Grande songs
Kelly Clarkson songs
Songs written by Kelly Clarkson